Kondamuru is a village in Prakasam district of Andhra Pradesh, India.

References 

Villages in Prakasam district